Joseph Watson (1 January 1952 – 30 September 2000) was an Australian footballer who played as a winger in a 24-year career extending from 1968 to 1992.

Playing career
A native of Fife, Joe Watson had been playing with Nottingham Forest since the age of 16, but began his professional career at 18 in 1970 with Dundee United, participating in a handful of games before joining Forfar Athletic in 1972. After one season with Forfar, Watson emigrated to Australia in 1973 where, like another Scottish player for United, Kenny Murphy, he spent many seasons playing international football for Australia national football team, primarily Sydney City.

Sydney City
In Australia he played for Sydney Hakoah. At Sydney City he played four seasons in the New South Wales State League before the club as Sydney City joined the National Soccer League in 1977. Watson played 258 National Soccer League matches, playing with the club until 1986.

International career
Watson played 17 matches for Australia between 1979 and 1986. While he had retired from international football in 1985, he was honoured with being named captain in a friendly against Czechoslovakia in August 1986. He was replaced after five minutes by Angie Postecoglou.

Coaching career
In 1991 while still playing Watson began coaching at Waverley. In a nine-year coaching career Watson coached at eight separate clubs.

Illness and death
Watson was diagnosed with liver cancer, after which a day of charity matches was scheduled in August 2000 to raise funds. Watson died on 30 September 2000.

Honours

Scotland
 Forfarshire Cup
 Champion: 1971-72

Australia
 NSW State League
 Waratah Cup Champion: 1976

 National Soccer League Player of the Year: 1983
 National Soccer League
 Champion: 1977, 1980, 1981, 1982
 Runner Up: 1978, 1983, 1985

OFC Nations Cup
 Champion: 1980

References

External links
 
 Article mentioning Joe Watson's death

Footballers from Fife
Australian soccer players
Dundee United F.C. players
Forfar Athletic F.C. players
Australia international soccer players
1952 births
2000 deaths
Scottish Football League players
Scottish footballers
Scottish emigrants to Australia
Nottingham Forest F.C. players
Sydney City players
APIA Leichhardt FC players
Association football wingers